Jefferson Land Association Historic District is a national historic district located at Bristol, Bucks County, Pennsylvania. It encompasses 81 contributing buildings on 5 blocks in a primarily residential area of Bristol constructed in 1917–1918. They are two-story, brick rowhouse dwellings with flat roofs.  They are characterized by a one-story, unifying front porch for all houses in a block. The second floor has a projecting, three-sided bay and each dwelling has a two-story rear ell.  The district includes five commercial buildings situated at the end of rows.

It was added to the National Register of Historic Places in 1987.

References

Historic districts in Bucks County, Pennsylvania
Historic districts on the National Register of Historic Places in Pennsylvania
National Register of Historic Places in Bucks County, Pennsylvania